Luciana Bonifacio Julaton is an American former professional boxer and mixed martial artist. She was the first to win the Women's WBO Super Bantamweight and IBA Super Bantamweight titles. Nicknamed "The Hurricane", she is also one of the quickest boxers ever to win a world title, having fought just five previous professional bouts before winning the IBA Super Bantamweight title.

In mixed martial arts, Julaton competed for ONE Fighting Championship and Bellator MMA.

Julaton retired from combat sports in March 2018.

Boxing career

Early career

Julaton was born in San Francisco, California. Despite her father making her train in martial arts when she was little, she had no interest in boxing whatsoever. It was only while working as a bok-fu instructor, at the West Wind Martial Arts and Boxing School in Berkeley, California, that Julaton was introduced to boxing through a lecture session organized by her now trainer-manager, Angelo Reyes.

Amateur career
Julaton made her amateur boxing debut in 2004, managing to win silver in the San Francisco Golden Gloves despite having officially trained for just two weeks. After delivering a good performance at the National Golden Gloves in 2005, Julaton would be taken under the wing of two-division world champion Carina Moreno and trainer Rick Noble, further improving her craft.

By 2007, she was ranked second among all female amateur boxers in the US, and took  part in the unsuccessful campaign to include women's boxing in the 2008 Beijing Olympics.

Professional career
At this point, Julaton decided to turn pro, and approached veteran trainer Freddie Roach. Impressing Roach with her work ethic — even sparring against male fighters — Julaton eventually became part of Roach's large stable of boxers, alongside Filipino boxing legend Manny Pacquiao and former world champion Gerry Peñalosa.

She was scheduled to make her pro debut against Hondi Hernandez on the undercard of the Pacquiao-Barrera rematch in October 2007, but her fight was canceled when Hernandez failed to make weight. Julaton instead fought and won against Rita Valentini a month later. This was followed by several other successful fights, culminating in her first title win against Kelsey “The Road Warrior” Jeffries on September 12, 2009 for the vacant International Boxing Association super bantamweight title in women's boxing.

Now trained by Nonito Donaire Sr., father of boxer Nonito Donaire Jr., Julaton followed up that win by defeating Donna Biggers and becoming the first female World Boxing Organization Super Bantamweight champion on December 4, 2009. Her next fight was on March 27, 2010, against boxer Lisa Brown for the vacant World Boxing Association junior featherweight title.

Mixed martial arts career

ONE Fighting Championship 
Julaton signed a contract with ONE Fighting Championship to compete in women's mixed martial arts.  She is a black belt in Bok Fu, an aggressive martial arts system that combines the Five Animals style of Kung Fu – Tiger, Crane, Panther, Snake, and Dragon – with Kenpo Karate and Shotokan. She is also a black belt in Taekwondo

Julaton made her debut at ONE FC: Rise of Heroes on May 2, 2014 against Aya-Saeid Saber. She was successful in her debut, winning the fight via TKO in the third round.

On August 29, 2014, Julaton suffered her first loss to Ann Osman of Malaysia at ONE FC: Reign of Champions.

On December 5, 2014, Ana defeated Walaa Abbas of Egypt in ONE FC: Warrior's Way at the Mall of Asia Arena in the Philippines. Julaton improved her mixed martial arts record to 2–1.

On December 11, 2015, Julaton lost to Irina Mazepa of Russia at ONE Championship: Spirit of Champions. It would be her last fight in ONE.

Bellator MMA 
In September 2017 it was announced Ana Julaton was signed to Bellator MMA.

Julaton faced Lisa Blaine at Bellator 185 on October 20, 2017. She lost the fight via split decision.

Julaton faced Heather Hardy on February 16, 2018 at Bellator 194. She lost the fight via unanimous decision.

She retired from mixed martial arts and combat sports the following month with an MMA record of 2–4.

Achievements

Professional career
2009
WBO Super Bantamweight World Champion
IBA Super Bantamweight World Champion

Amateur Record
2007
Rank No. 2, United States Nationwide Rankings
Silver Medalist, United States Championship
Gold Medalist, San Francisco Championship
2006
Champion, National Diamond Belt
California State Champion
Champion, San Francisco Golden Gloves
Rank No, . 5 Quarter-finalist, United States Championship
Silver Medalist, Nor Cal Championship
2005
Rank No. 6, United States Nationwide Rankings
Bronze Medalist, National Golden Gloves
Champion, San Francisco Diamond Belt
Best Fight of the Tournament and Quarter-finalist, National PAL Championships
Silver Medalist, San Francisco Golden Gloves
Quarter-finalist, United States Championship
Silver Medalist, Nor Cal Championship
2004
Silver Medalist, San Francisco Golden Gloves

Professional boxing record

| style="text-align:center;" colspan="8"|14 Wins (2 knockouts, 12 decisions),  4 Loss, 3 Draws
|-  style="text-align:center; background:#e3e3e3;"
|  style="border-style:none none solid solid; "|Res.
|  style="border-style:none none solid solid; "|Record
|  style="border-style:none none solid solid; "|Opponent
|  style="border-style:none none solid solid; "|Type
|  style="border-style:none none solid solid; "|Round
|  style="border-style:none none solid solid; "|Date
|  style="border-style:none none solid solid; "|Location
|  style="border-style:none none solid solid; "|Notes
|- align=center 
|Draw
|14–4–3
|align=left| Maria Jose Nunez
|
|
|
|align=left|
|align=left|
|- align=center 
|Draw
|14–4–2
|align=left| Karla Valenzuela
|
|
|
|align=left|
|align=left|
|- align=center 
|Win
|14–4–1
|align=left| Yolanda Segura
|
|
|
|align=left|
|align=left|
|- align=center
|Win
|13–4–1
|align=left| Perla Hernandez
|
|
|
|align=left|
|align=left|
|- align=center
|Loss
|12–4–1
|align=left| Celina Salazar
|
|
|
|align=left|
|align=left|
|- align=center
|Win
|12–3–1
|align=left| Abigail Ramos
|
|
|
|align=left|
|align=left|
|- align=center
|Win
|11–3–1
|align=left| Yolanda Segura
|
|
|
|align=left|
|align=left|
|- align=center
|Loss
|10–3–1
|align=left| Yesica Patricia Marcos
|
|
|
|align=left|
|align=left|
|- align=center
|Win
|10–2–1
|align=left| Jessica Villafranca
|
|
|
|align=left|
|align=left|
|- align=center
|Win
|9–2–1
|align=left| Angel Gladney
|
|
|
|align=left|
|align=left|
|- align=center
|Win
|8–2–1
|align=left| Franchesca Alcanter
|
|
|
|align=left|
|align=left|
|- align=center
|Win
|7–2–1
|align=left| Maria Elena Villalobos
|
|
|
|align=left|
|align=left|
|- align=center
|Loss
|6–2–1
|align=left| Lisa Brown
|
|
|
|align=left|
|align=left|
|- align=center
|Win
|6–1–1
|align=left| Donna Biggers
|
|
|
|align=left|
|align=left|
|- align=center
|Win
|5–1–1
|align=left| Kelsey Jeffries
|
|
|
|align=left|
|align=left|
|- align=center
|Loss
|4–1–1
|align=left| Dominga Olivo
|
|
|
|align=left|
|align=left|
|- align=center
|style="background: #C5D2EA"|Draw
|4–0–1
|align=left| Johanna Mendez
|
|
|
|align=left|
|align=left|
|- align=center
|Win
|4–0–0
|align=left| Salina Jordan
|
|
|
|align=left|
|align=left|
|- align=center
|Win
|3–0–0
|align=left| Clara De la Torre
|
|
|
|align=left|
|align=left|
|- align=center
|Win
|2–0–0
|align=left| Carly Batey
|
|
|
|align=left|
|align=left|
|- align=center
|Win
|1–0–0
|align=left| Margherita Valentini
|
|
|
|align=left|
|align=left|
|- align=center

Mixed martial arts record

|-
|Loss
|align=center|2–4
|Heather Hardy
|Decision (unanimous)
|Bellator 194
|
|align=center|3
|align=center|5:00
|Uncasville, Connecticut, United States
|
|-
|Loss
|align=center|2–3
|Lisa Blaine
|Decision (split)
|Bellator 185
|
|align=center|3
|align=center|5:00
|Uncasville, Connecticut, United States
|
|-
|Loss
|align=center|2–2
|Irina Mazepa
|Decision (unanimous)
|ONE Championship 35: Spirit of Champions
|
|align=center|3
|align=center|5:00
|Manila, Philippines
|
|-
|Win
|align=center|2–1
|Walaa Abas Mohamed Kamaly
|Decision (unanimous)
|ONE FC 23: Warrior's Way
|
|align=center|3
|align=center|5:00
|Pasay, Philippines
|
|-
|Loss
|align=center|1–1
|Ann Osman
|Decision (split)
|ONE FC 19: Reign of Champions
|
|align=center|3
|align=center|5:00
|  Dubai, UAE
|
|-
|Win
|align=center| 1–0
|Aya-Saeid Saber
|TKO (punches and elbows)
|ONE FC 15: Rise of Heroes
|
|align=center|3
|align=center|3:59
|Pasay, Philippines
|
|-
|}

References

External links
Team Julaton Official Site. Accessed March 3, 2010.
Promising Prospect: Ana Julaton – 15Rounds.com. Accessed March 3, 2010.
Ana Julaton scores upset to win IBA title – Inquirer.net. Accessed March 3, 2010.
Ana Julaton – BoxRec.com. Accessed March 3, 2010.
Ana Julaton debuts as prof in Pacquiao-Barrera rematch – GMANews.TV. Accessed March 3, 2010.
Ana Julaton wins the WBO Women’s world title! - FightFan.com. Accessed March 3, 2010.
Ana Julaton awaits Donaire Sr.'s arrival – Philboxing.net. Accessed March 3, 2010.

Year of birth missing (living people)
Date of birth missing (living people)
Living people
Sportspeople from San Francisco
American women boxers
American sportspeople of Filipino descent
Boxers from San Francisco
American female mixed martial artists
Mixed martial artists from California
Mixed martial artists utilizing American Kenpo
Mixed martial artists utilizing Shotokan
Mixed martial artists utilizing taekwondo
Mixed martial artists utilizing boxing
Bantamweight mixed martial artists
American female karateka
American female taekwondo practitioners
American eskrimadors
American mixed martial artists of Filipino descent
Flyweight mixed martial artists
American people of Ilocano descent
21st-century American women